The Bruford Tapes is a live 1979 album by the British band Bruford, only issued in the United States, Canada and Japan. It was recorded on July 12, 1979 in Roslyn, New York State and originally broadcast on WLIR radio. Shortly before the tour, guitarist Allan Holdsworth left the band and was replaced by his student John Clark (appearing as "the unknown John Clark" on the album sleeve), who had played with the prog group Quasar. The show features extended performances of material from the group's previous two albums Feels Good to Me and One of a Kind.

Reception

In a review for AllMusic, Paul Collins wrote: "This is one of the best Bruford albums of this period; those who found the studio releases of these songs to be too cold will be won over by the improvisational intensity of this live show."

The authors of The Penguin Guide to Jazz Recordings called the music "strongly melodic, freewheeling and built round Bruford's ringing percussion."

John Kelman of All About Jazz commented: "The Bruford Tapes, with its combination of high volume intensity, detailed long-form writing and reckless improvisational abandon, does nothing to assuage those looking for easy categorization. It is, however, as fine an example as you're apt to find of the kind of unrestricted exploration and cross-pollination once seen on major labels, but now more often relegated to the small independents."

Track listing 
Side one
"Hell's Bells" (Alan Gowen, Dave Stewart) - 4:02 	
"Sample and Hold" (Bruford, Stewart) - 6:18 	
"Fainting in Coils | Back to the Beginning | Fainting in Coils" (Bruford) - 6:34 	
"Travels with Myself – And Someone Else" (Bruford) - 4:37

Side two	
"Beelzebub" (Bruford) - 3:28 	
"The Sahara of Snow - part one" (Bruford) - 4:46 	
"The Sahara of Snow - part two" (Bruford, Eddie Jobson) - 3:07 	
"One of a Kind - part two" (Bruford, Stewart) - 8:06
"5G" (Berlin, Bruford, Stewart) - 2:39

2005 CD bonus cut

10. "The Age of Information" (Bruford, Stewart)

Personnel 
 Bill Bruford – drums & percussions
 Dave Stewart – electric piano, synthesizer, electronics
 Jeff Berlin – bass guitar
 John Clark – electric guitar

References

External links 
 http://www.billbruford.com/ (Bill Bruford's website)

1979 live albums
Bill Bruford albums
E.G. Records albums